is a Japanese-language newspaper in Indonesia. The company distributing the paper, PT. Bina Komunika Asiatama, has its headquarters in Jakarta. Circulation in 2009 was about 4,000.

History

The company has been established on 28 July 1998 by 6 founders namely Mr. Fredi Chandra, Mr. Adam Nugroho, Mr. Jusuf Karadibrata, Mr. Drs. Soekrisno and Dr. Ryuji Nakamura led by General Wiyogo Atmodarminto. On November 6, 1998, Yasuo Kusano, a Japanese journalist, was invited as editor-in-chief of the newspaper. Kusano was formerly the Mainichi Shimbun bureau chief in Jakarta from 1981 to 1986; he returned to Indonesia after the fall of Suharto, and, finding that many publications banned during the Suharto era were being revived, decided to found a newspaper to provide accurate, in-depth information about Indonesia's new democratisation to Japanese readers. Its circulation was 50 in the beginning.

Contents
Each issue has eight pages except on Fridays; on those days there is also an additional lifestyle supplement. Therefore, Friday issues have a total of 12 pages.

Distribution
The newspaper company distributes copies to Garuda Indonesia for the airline to provide to Japanese customers. It also distributes copies to language centres and universities for students of the Japanese language.

See also
 Japanese migration to Indonesia
 Jakarta Japanese School

References

Further reading
 東 敬生. マスメディア・ウオッチング インドネシア「じゃかるた新聞」 邦人社会のコミュニティー紙目指す. World Affairs Weekly (世界週報) 82(20), 32, 2001-05-29. 時事通信社. See profile at CiNii.

External links
  

Daily Jakarta Shimbun
Daily Jakarta Shimbun
Newspapers established in 1998
1998 establishments in Indonesia